5250 Can refer to:
The year in the 6th millennium
IBM 5250
Welfare and Institutions (WIC) Code 5250, or 5250 (Involuntary psychiatric hold).